Pure Juice is the debut album by alternative rock band Summercamp, released in 1997 by Maverick Recording Company.

Background and promotion
After signing with Madonna's Maverick Records in late 1996, Summercamp began working on their major label debut. Summercamp would be heavily hyped in the press, with Madonna telling MTV that the band were better than Oasis. Pure Juice was released on June 17, 1997, and that same month the band joined the 1997 edition of the Lollapalooza festival, which ran to August. To further promote the album, a music video was made for the single "Drawer".

Reception
"Drawer" peaked at #21 on the Modern Rock chart in the US, receiving airplay in the summer of 1997. Another single, "Should I Walk Away", became a top ten hit in Japan.

Jason Ankeny of AllMusic gave the album two and a half stars, labelling it "derivative and highly formulaic" and "heavily influenced by late-'70s radio". Sky Daniels of R&R magazine commented that, "Summercamp continues a natural progression for Santa Barbara bands, beginning with a harder faster approach than its predecessors, but still yielding the prerequisite humm-ability that living in Paradise elicits."

Appearances in other media
In 1998, "On Her Mind" appeared in the film BASEketball, and in 2000 the song "Nowhere Near" appeared on the soundtrack for Digimon: The Movie. "Play It By Ear" was also used in the Buffy the Vampire Slayer episode "Crush".

Track listing
All songs produced by Chris Shaw and Summercamp.

Band members
 Tim Cullen - guitars and vocals
 Sean McCue - guitars and vocals
 Misha Feldmann - bass/backing vocals
 Tony Sevener - drums/backing vocals

Additional personnel
 Chris Shaw - engineering and mixing
 Dave Nottingham, Tom Fiore & James Murray - 2nd engineers
 Eddy Schreyer at Oasis Mastering
 David Young - Talent manager (Bliss Artist Management)
 David Levine - Booking agent (William Morris)
 Guy Oseary - A&R
 Jamie Young & David Lande - legal representation
 Todd Gelfand - business management (Gelfand, Rennert and Feldman)
 Kevin Reagan & Larimie Garcia - art direction/design
 Karl Hentz - cover photo
 Larry Mills, Chris Strother, Jodi Wille, Kristen Lauck - inside photos

References

1997 debut albums
Summercamp albums
Maverick Records albums